E. Christian Kopff (born 22 November 1946, Brooklyn, New York) is Associate Professor of Classics and Associate Director of the Honors Program at the University of Colorado Boulder, where he has taught since 1973.  He is a Fellow of the American Academy in Rome and has been awarded grants from the National Endowment for the Humanities and the CU Committee on Research. He has been a contributor to far-right publications.

Academics 
Kopff studied at St. Paul's School (Garden City, New York) before attending Haverford College, from which he received his undergraduate diploma summa cum laude. His doctoral degree in Classics was awarded by the University of North Carolina at Chapel Hill.

Views 
Kopff was described by the Southern Poverty Law Center (SPLC) in 2008 as one of the "notable academic racists" leading the H.L. Mencken Club, of which he was vice president. He has contributed to The Occidental Quarterly, described by the SPLC as a far-right race journal, and Social Contract, an anti-immigrant publication.

He has been described as a paleoconservative, and as such he has cited religious and cultural grounds for supporting capital punishment, and described modern American society as a "leftist hegemony" in a piece for a white nationalist publication encouraging "members of the American Alternative Right" to read the works of the Italian far-right philosopher Julius Evola prior to embarking on his own translation of two of Evola's works on Italian Fascism and Nazism.

Selected publications

Author 

 later reprinted as Julius Evola, an Introduction

Translator

References

External links 
Dr. Christian E. Kopff on "Classical Greek Philosophy and American Democratic Thought"

1946 births
Living people
American translators
American white supremacists
Classical scholars of the University of Colorado
University of Colorado Boulder faculty
University of North Carolina at Chapel Hill alumni
Writers from Brooklyn
Paleoconservatism